Pat Garrod (b. Chelmsford 1964) is a British physician and long distance motorcyclist. He and his wife Vanessa Lewis undertook a  round-the-world ride on a 1991 BMW R100GS, between 1998 and October, 2002.

His 2010 book Bearback — The World Overland describing the 4-year journey was called as a "damned good story" by Overland magazine, and evidence of improving quality in self-published overland adventure books.

After the circumnavigation, Garrod and Lewis crossed Africa twice more by motorcycle.

Bibliography

References

External links

Long-distance motorcycle riders
Motorcycle touring writers
English sportswriters
20th-century English medical doctors
21st-century English medical doctors
Living people
1964 births
People from Chelmsford
Alumni of the University of Southampton